Kaakyire Kwame Fosu (born 14 February 1981) is a Ghanaian hiplife musician known by stage name KK Fosu.He is known for songs like "Suudwe", "Anadwo Yede" among others.

Life and career 
KK Fosu started music at his tender age with a junior school choir back in the Secondary School. He joined a live band group named "Soundz Unlimited" where he played for two years.He was later signed by DKB productions.

KK Fosu has released five albums titled "Sudwe", "Anadwo Yede", "6'oclock", Akonoba" and "Toffee". He has worked with musicians like Obrafour, Obour, Reggie Rockstone and several others.

Demonstration 
In September 2020, KK Fosu led a demonstration together with the Mangoase Youth Association over the bad state of roads in Mangoase, Adawso and Tinkong roads.

References 

Ghanaian musicians
Living people
1981 births